Wang Shusen (born 19 January 1967) is a Chinese former cyclist. He competed in two events at the 1992 Summer Olympics.

References

External links
 

1967 births
Living people
Chinese male cyclists
Olympic cyclists of China
Cyclists at the 1992 Summer Olympics
Place of birth missing (living people)
Asian Games medalists in cycling
Cyclists at the 1990 Asian Games
Asian Games silver medalists for China
Medalists at the 1990 Asian Games
20th-century Chinese people